Cheddar Gorge is a limestone gorge in the Mendip Hills, near the village of Cheddar, Somerset, England. The gorge is the site of the Cheddar show caves, where Britain's oldest complete human skeleton, Cheddar Man, estimated to be 9,000 years old, was found in 1903. Older remains from the Upper Late Palaeolithic era (12,000–13,000 years ago) have been found. The caves, produced by the activity of an underground river, contain stalactites and stalagmites. The gorge is part of a Site of Special Scientific Interest called Cheddar Complex.

Cheddar Gorge, including the caves and other attractions, has become a tourist destination. In a 2005 poll of Radio Times readers, following its appearance on the television programme Seven Natural Wonders (2005), Cheddar Gorge was named as the second greatest natural wonder in Britain, surpassed only by Dan yr Ogof caves.
The gorge attracts about 500,000 visitors per year.

Geology 

Cheddar is a gorge lying on the southern edge of the Mendip Hills. The B3135 road runs along the bottom of the gorge.

The area is underlain by Black Rock slate, Burrington Oolite and Clifton Down Limestone of the Carboniferous Limestone Series, which contain ooliths and fossil debris, on top of Old Red Sandstone and by dolomitic conglomerate of the Keuper. Evidence for Variscan orogeny is seen in the sheared rock and cleaved shales. In many places weathering of these strata has resulted in the formation of immature calcareous soils.

The gorge was formed by meltwater floods during the cold periglacial periods which have occurred over the last 1.2 million years. During the ice ages, permafrost blocked the caves with ice and frozen mud and made the limestone impermeable. When this melted during the summers, water was forced to flow on the surface, and carved out the gorge. During warmer periods, the water flowed underground through the permeable limestone, creating the caves and leaving the gorge dry, so that today much of the gorge has no river until the underground Cheddar Yeo river emerges in the lower part from Gough's Cave. The river is used by Bristol Water, who maintain a series of dams and ponds which supply the nearby Cheddar Reservoir, via a  diameter pipe that takes water just upstream of the Rotary Club Sensory Garden, a public park in the gorge opposite Jacob's Ladder.

The gorge is susceptible to flooding. In the Chew Stoke flood of 1968, the flow of water washed large boulders down the gorge, damaging the cafe and entrance to Gough's Cave and washing away cars. In the cave itself the flooding lasted for three days. In 2012 the B3135, the road through the gorge, was closed for several weeks following damage to the road surface during extensive flooding.

Ownership 
The south side of the gorge is owned and administered by the Marquess of Bath's Longleat Estate. The cliffs on the north side of the gorge are owned by The National Trust. Every year, both of the gorge's owners contribute funds towards the clearance of scrub, bush and trees from the area.

Most of the commercial visitor activity in the gorge is on the Longleat-owned south side, including access to the two main commercial show caves and the visitor centre, which is operated by Longleat-owned company Cheddar Gorge and Caves Ltd under director Hugh Cornwell. Because visitors to the show caves have decreased from 400,000 a year in the 1980s to 150,000 in 2013, Ceawlin Thynn, Viscount Weymouth, who runs the Longleat estate on behalf of the family trust, proposed the installation of a  18-gondola cable car at an estimated cost of £10m, which would take visitors from the entrance area to the caves directly to the top of the southside cliffs. The National Trust opposed the proposed development, stating that it would spoil the view and cheapen the experience, creating a "fairground ride" that would make the area feel more like an amusement park. Planning permission was planned in Spring 2014, which would have meant that operations would start in Spring 2016. In 2015 the financial feasibility was still being investigated.

Ecology 

Notable species at the gorge include dormice, yellow-necked mice, slowworms and adders and the rare large blue butterfly (Maculinea arion), and small pearl-bordered fritillary (Boloria selene).

A wide variety of wild birds may be seen in Cheddar Gorge including peregrine falcon, buzzard, kestrel, raven and grasshopper warbler.

The flora include chalk grassland-loving species such as marjoram and wild thyme. The Cheddar pink, Dianthus gratianopolitanus, also known as firewitch, only grows in the wild in the gorge. It was once common in the gorge but declined after being picked by collectors. It is also home to unique species of whitebeam.
The nationally rare little robin geranium (Geranium purpureum), and Cheddar bedstraw (Galium fleurotii) and the nationally scarce species include slender tare (Vicia tenuissima), dwarf mouse-ear (Cerastium pumilum) and rock stonecrop (Sedum forsteranum) also occur in the gorge. It is one of the few localities in England with native populations of the Welsh poppy Papaver cambricum. It is one of the very few areas in southern Britain where the lichens Solorina saccata, Squamaria cartilaginea and Caloplaca cirrochroa can be found.

The gorge is also an important site for whitebeams and in 2009 a survey was carried out by botanists from the Welsh National Herbarium as part of a nationwide survey of whitebeams. Among the eight species identified were three new species previously unknown to science. Nineteen specimens with oval-shaped leaves were named the "Cheddar whitebeam", Sorbus cheddarensis, fifteen specimens with roundish leaves and greyish brown bark were named the "Twin Cliffs whitebeam", Sorbus eminentoides, and thirteen with long, narrow leaves were named "Gough’s Rock whitebeam", Sorbus rupicoloides. The Cheddar whitebeam, which has evolved as a cross between the common whitebeam and the grey-leaved whitebeam, is unique to the gorge, but its survival is threatened by the goats that were introduced specifically to keep down the growth of new trees and encourage the proliferation of rare plant species such as the Cheddar pink. Cuttings have been taken from the trees to be grafted and grown on at the Welsh National Herbarium.

Longleat Estate has fenced off a large part of its land and has introduced goats, as part of a programme to encourage the biodiversity of the area; the goats were intended to replace the sheep that grazed in the gorge until the 1970s. The National Trust announced in March 2007 that it plans to release a flock of sheep on its side of the gorge for the same purpose, but will first consult local residents and interested parties on whether to fence off the gorge or introduce cattle grids to prevent the sheep from straying. There is already a small flock of feral Soay sheep in the gorge.

Caves 

The two main caves open to the public are on the southside of the Gorge, owned by Longleat Estate. The extensive Gough's Cave and the smaller Cox's Cave are both named after their respective discoverers. Both are known for their geology, and it has been suggested that the caves were used for maturing cheese in prehistoric times.

Gough's cave, which was discovered in 1903, leads around  into the rock-face, and contains a variety of large rock chambers and formations.
Cox's Cave, discovered in 1837, is smaller but contains many intricate formations. In 2016 Cox's cave was turned into "Dreamhunters", a multimedia walk-through experience with theatrical lighting and video projection.

The Gorge's many caves are home to colonies of Greater and Lesser horseshoe bats.

In 1999, the Channel 4 television programme Time Team investigated Cooper's Hole in an attempt to find evidence of Palaeolithic human activity.

These caves are the inspirations for the glittering caves of Helm's Deep in J. R. R. Tolkien's The Two Towers.

Several of the caves have been scheduled as ancient monuments as nationally important archaeological sites including: Gough's Old Cave, Great Oone's Hole, Saye's Hole, Soldier's Hole and Sun Hole.

Recreational use 

Cliff Road (B3135), which runs through the Gorge, offers a popular climb for bicyclists and has a maximum gradient of 16%. The ascent featured in stage 6 of the 2011 Tour of Britain.

There are about 590 graded rock climbing routes on the South side of the gorge, which are generally open to climbers between 1 October and 15 March each year. The North side of the gorge has about 380 climbing routes and the land is predominantly owned by the National Trust and mapped as Open Access land which give a right of access for climbers all year. Each of the routes is named and included in the British Mountaineering Council guidebook. Although the majority of the climbs are "trad" or "traditional", which means that the leader places protection as they go up, there are also some "sport" routes where bolts are left in place. Climber Chris Bonington was the first to scale the Coronation Street route in 1965.

Visitors to the gorge have experienced a number of accidents. Rescue services, including local mountain rescue and cave rescue groups, frequently use the gorge to stage exercises. It is also used as a training location for military rescue helicopter pilots.

The Cheddar Man Museum of Prehistory inspired by the discovery of ancient hominids such as Cheddar Man contains information about the caves and their palaeontological development. Exhibits include original flint tools and human remains excavated from the caves. The Visitors' Centre and Restaurant is an important Modernist design by Geoffrey Jellicoe, dating from 1934. Jellicoe was commissioned by the fifth Marquess of Bath, and created a two-block structure with a roof-top pool. He drew inspiration from International Modernist buildings, including the De La Warr Pavilion. The integrity of the building has been greatly compromised. In the 1960s, the glass roof to the restaurant, and the pool set above it, were removed to increase seating capacity, and it has since been re-clad in poor quality materials. Michael Spens, in his comprehensive study, The Complete Landscape Designs and Gardens of Geoffrey Jellicoe, writes that it is "now barely recognizable as a pioneer construction of the modern period".

There is a clifftop walk from Jacob's Ladder along the crest of the gorge and back to the road, with views of the gorge. A caving experience is offered within Gough's Cave. There is a path of 275 steps, built up the side of the gorge, known as Jacob's Ladder after the Biblical description of a ladder to the heavens. A watchtower at the top provides a 360–degree view of the entire area and village. An open-top bus tour operates during the summer. Cheddar cheese is made in the lower part of the gorge.

See also 
 Geology of the United Kingdom
 List of National Trust properties in Somerset

References 
Notes

External 

 Cheddar Caves and Gorge, a commercial company operating some of the tourist attractions at Cheddar Gorge, Somerset
 British Geological Survey information about Cheddar Gorge
 Cheddar Gorge at Beautiful World

Landforms of Somerset
Mendip Hills
Canyons and gorges of England
Tourist attractions in Somerset
National Trust properties in Somerset

Iron Age sites in Somerset
Cheddar, Somerset